McCauley-Watson House is a historic home located on Blanchard Rd near Union Ridge, Alamance County, North Carolina. It was built about 1850, and is a two-story, three bay, center hall plan, brick vernacular Greek Revival style farmhouse. It has a single-story rear kitchen ell.

It was added to the National Register of Historic Places in 1994.

References

Houses on the National Register of Historic Places in North Carolina
Greek Revival houses in North Carolina
Houses completed in 1850
Houses in Alamance County, North Carolina
National Register of Historic Places in Alamance County, North Carolina